The 2022 Midwestern State Mustangs football team represented Midwestern State University as a member of the Lone Star Conference (LSC) during the 2022 NCAA Division II football season. They were led by twenty-first-year head coach Bill Maskill. The Mustangs played their home games at Memorial Stadium in Wichita Falls, Texas.

Previous season
The Mustangs finished the 2021 season 7–3, 6–1 in Lone Star Conference (LSC) play, finished first in the conference standings. First time winning the conference title since the 2017 season. As conference champions, Midwestern State did not qualify to the playoffs.

Schedule

Rankings

References

Midwestern State
Midwestern State Mustangs football seasons
Midwestern State Mustangs football